David Keogh (born 1999) is an Irish hurler who plays for Dublin Senior Championship club Thomas Davis and at inter-county level with the Dublin senior hurling team. He usually lines out at midfield.

Career

A member of the Thomas Davis club in Tallaght, Keogh first came to prominence on the inter-county scene as a member of the Dublin minor team that won the 2016 Leinster Championship. He subsequently lined out with the Dublin under-21 team. Keogh joined the Dublin senior hurling team in 2019.

Honours

Dublin 
Leinster Minor Hurling Championship: 2016

References

External links
Davy Keogh profile at the Dublin GAA website

1999 births
Living people
Dublin inter-county hurlers
Irish carpenters
Thomas Davis hurlers